Screenagers is a documentary created and directed by Delaney Ruston, a physician and film director, to describe growing up in a tech saturated world where it is her opinion that balance needs to be drawn between screen time and screen free time.
In the documentary, filmmaker Delaney Ruston must decide if she should give an iPhone to her teenage daughter.

References

External links

American documentary films
Documentary films about technology
Documentary films about the Internet
2016 documentary films
2010s English-language films
2010s American films